Piłsudski is a Polish coat of arms. The Piłsudski family, whom belonged to the Polish nobility (szlachta), used it.

History

Blazon

The Coat of arms of  Piłsudski is a variation of the Coat of arms of Kościesza

Notable bearers

Notable bearers of this coat of arms include:

 Józef Piłsudski  Chief of State and Marshal of Poland
 Adam Piłsudski
 Jadwiga Piłsudska
 Jan Piłsudski
 Bronisław Piłsudski
Franciszek Piłsudski
Jan Chryzostom Piłsudski

See also

 Polish heraldry
 Heraldic family
 List of Polish nobility coats of arms

Related Coat of Arms
 Kościesza Coat of Arms

Bibliography
 Herbarz polski, Tadeusz Gajl, Gdańsk 2007, 

Polish coats of arms
Piłsudski family